4-Diphosphocytidyl-2-C-methylerythritol (or CDP-ME) is an intermediate in the MEP pathway (non-mevalonate pathway) of isoprenoid precursor biosynthesis. It is produced by the enzyme 2-C-methyl-D-erythritol 4-phosphate cytidylyltransferase (IspD) and is a substrate for CDP-ME kinase (IspE).

Organophosphates